Michael Derek Jackson (born July 13, 1964) is a former American professional basketball player who played in three NBA seasons for the Sacramento Kings from 1987 to 1990. A 6'2" guard from Georgetown University, Jackson was a member of the 1984 Hoyas team that won the Division I national championship and returned to the Final Four the following year.

Following his college career, Jackson was selected by the New York Knicks in the second round (47th pick overall) of the 1986 NBA draft. In his NBA career, Jackson played in 89 games, scored a total of 188 points, and had 198 assists. He led the Kings in assists in a number of games in the 1987–88 season. He was a member of Georgetown's 1984 National Championship team. After graduating with a degree in sociology in 1986, he was accepted to Harvard Kennedy School at Harvard University. Upon retirement, Jackson assumed management positions with the United States Olympic Committee and Turner Sports and served as the president of Yankees–Nets (currently known as YES Network). He worked in a number of executive positions at Nike, Inc, including vice president and general manager of global basketball from 2014 to 2016.

References

External links
Michael Jackson NBA statistics, basketballreference.com

1964 births
Living people
American men's basketball players
Basketball players from Virginia
Georgetown Hoyas men's basketball players
New York Knicks draft picks
Point guards
Sacramento Kings players
Sportspeople from Fairfax, Virginia